The following notable pupils of Eton College were born in the 20th century.

1900s
Thomas Bevan (1900–1942), first-class cricketer and British Army officer
Colin Cokayne-Frith (1900–1940), first-class cricketer and British Army officer
King Leopold III of the Belgians (1901–1983), King of the Belgians, 1934–1951
John Strachey (1901–1963)
Philip Evergood (1901–1973)
Victor Hely-Hutchinson (1901–1947)
Sir Gubby Allen (1902–1989), England cricketer
Peter Cazalet (1907–1973), English cricketer, jockey, racehorse owner and trainer
Lord David Cecil (1902–1986), literary critic
Christopher Hollis (1902–1977), intelligence officer
Dadie Rylands (1902–1999), Cambridge don and member of the Bloomsbury Group
Prince Nicholas of Romania (1903–1978)
Norman Barrett (1903–1979)
Edward Chichester, 6th Marquess of Donegall (1903–1975)
Cyril Connolly (1903–1974), author and journalist
Douglas Douglas-Hamilton, 14th Duke of Hamilton (1903–1973) aviator, first man to fly over Mount Everest
Alec Douglas-Home, Baron Home of the Hirsel (1903–1995), Secretary of State for Foreign Affairs, 1960–1963, 1970–1974, and Prime Minister, 1963–1964
Roger K. Furse (1903–1972), film designer
Sir John Heygate (1903–1976)
Sir Roger Mynors (1903–1989)
George Orwell (1903–1950), novelist
Sir Steven Runciman (1903–2000), historian
James Hamilton, 4th Duke of Abercorn (1904–1979)
Sir Harold Acton (1904–1994), writer and aesthete
Francis Thomas Bacon (1904–1992)
Cameron Fromenteel Cobbold, 1st Baron Cobbold of Knebworth (1904–1987), Governor, Bank of England, 1949–1961, and Lord Chamberlain, 1963–1971
Sir Paul Mason (1904–1978), diplomat
Oliver Messel (1904–1978), artist and stage designer
Godfrey Meynell (1904–1935), North West Frontier Victoria Cross
J. H. C. Whitehead (1904–1960)
Sir Watkin Williams-Wynn, 10th Baronet (1904–1988), Lord Lieutenant of Denbighshire and of Clwyd
Robert Byron (1905–1941), traveller, writer, art critic and historian
David Cecil, 6th Marquess of Exeter (1905–1981), hurdler, politician, and chairman, 1936–1966, and President, 1966–1977, British Olympic Association
Henry Green (1905–1973), novelist
Bryan Guinness, 2nd Baron Moyne (1905–1992), poet and novelist
Brian Howard (1905–1958), writer
Sir Harry Hylton-Foster (1905–1965), politician, Solicitor General for England and Wales, 1954–1959, and Speaker of the House of Commons, 1959–1965
Seymour de Lotbiniere (1905–1984), BBC Director of outside broadcasting
Frank Pakenham, 7th Earl of Longford (1905–2001), politician and writer
John Tew (1905–1992), cricketer and solicitor
Sir Trenchard Cox (1906–1995), museum director
George Douglas-Hamilton, 10th Earl of Selkirk (1906–1994), politician, Chancellor of the Duchy of Lancaster, 1955–1957 and First Lord of the Admiralty 1957–1959. First Commissioner to newly independent Singapore
Anthony Powell (1906–2000), novelist
William Astor, 3rd Viscount Astor (1907–1966), politician
Cuthbert Bardsley (1907–1991), bishop
Peter Fleming (1907–1971), writer, traveller and journalist
James Graham, 7th Duke of Montrose (1907–1992), politician
Sir Rupert Hart-Davis (1907–1999), publisher
Quintin Hogg, Baron Hailsham of St Marylebone (1907–2001), Lord Chancellor, 1970–1974, 1979–1987
John Lehmann (1907–1987), poet and editor
Ian Fleming (1908–1964), novelist and author of the James Bond series of spy novels
James Lees-Milne (1908–1997), author and diarist
Sir Anthony Wagner (1908–1995), herald of arms
Seymour Berry, 2nd Viscount Camrose (1909–1995), Chairman, The Daily Telegraph, 1987
Douglas Blackwood (1909–1997), publisher and Battle of Britain fighter pilot
Lord Malcolm Douglas-Hamilton (1909–1964), politician and aviator
Paul Gore-Booth, Baron Gore-Booth (1909–1984), High Commissioner to India, 1960–1965, and Permanent Under-Secretary of State for Foreign and Commonwealth Affairs, 1965–1969
Charles John Lyttelton, 10th Viscount Cobham (1909–1977)
Anthony Mildmay (1909–1950), amateur steeplechase jockey
William Sidney, 1st Viscount De L'Isle (1909–1991), Second World War Victoria Cross
Reynolds Stone (1909–1979)
Peter Thorneycroft, Baron Thorneycroft (1909–1994), Chancellor of the Exchequer (1957–1958)
General Sir Kenneth Darling (1909–1998)
Richard Ormonde Shuttleworth (1909–1940), racing driver and aviator
Robert Boothby, Baron Boothby (1900–1986), conservative politician, author and broadcaster, and associate of the Kray twins
Thomas Mitford (1909–1945) aristocrat and soldier, alleged supporter of fascism

1910s
Sir Archibald Southby (1910–1988), cricketer and soldier
Sir Alfred Ayer (1910–1989), philosopher and author
Lewis Clive (1910–1938), Spanish Civil War fighter
Sir Robin Darwin (1910–1974), Principal, Royal College of Art, 1948–1967, and painter
Samuel Hood, 6th Viscount Hood (1910–1981), diplomat
Charles Moore, 11th Earl of Drogheda (1910–1990), managing director, 1945–1970, and chairman, 1971–1975, The Financial Times
Edward Agar, 5th Earl of Normanton (1910–1967), landowner and soldier
Ernest Sheepshanks (1910–1937), Yorkshire cricketer and Reuters war correspondent
Robert Still (1910–1971), composer
Sir Wilfred Thesiger (1910–2003), explorer and travel writer
David Boyle, 9th Earl of Glasgow (1910–1984)
Michael Berry, Baron Hartwell (1911–2001), Chairman and Editor-in-Chief, The Daily Telegraph, 1954–1987, and The Sunday Telegraph, 1961–1987
Guy Burgess (1911–1963), intelligence officer and double agent
Randolph Frederick Edward Churchill (1911–1968), journalist and Conservative Member of Parliament (1940–1945); son of Sir Winston Churchill
Brigadier Bernard Fergusson, Baron Ballantrae (1911–1980), Governor-General of New Zealand, 1962–1967
Sir Fitzroy Maclean of Dunconnel (1911–1996)
Alexander Ogston, FRS (1911–1996), surgeon; discovered Staphylococcus aureus
David Astor (1912–2001), Editor, The Observer, 1948–1975
William Douglas-Home (1912–1992)
Sir John Arbuthnot, 1st Baronet (1912–1992), politician
James Fisher (1912–1970), ornithologist
Christopher Furness (1912–1940), Second World War Victoria Cross
Brian Johnston (1912–1994), radio commentator, author, and television personality
Pen Tennyson (1912–1941), film director
HH Birabongse Bhanudej, Prince Birabongse of Thailand (1913–1988)
Sir Charles Villiers (1912–1992), businessman and one-time Chairman of British Steel
Charles McLaren, 3rd Baron Aberconway (1913–2003)
Guy Branch (1913–1940), one of The Few and Empire Gallantry Medal holder
Lionel Brett, 4th Viscount Esher (1913–2004), architect
Martin Charteris, Baron Charteris of Amisfield (1913–1999), Private Secretary to the Queen
Jo Grimond, Baron Grimond (1913–1993)
General Paramasiva Prabhakar Kumaramangalam (1913–2000), Chief of Staff - Indian Army
Peter Lawrence (1913–2005), teacher
Charles Lyell, 2nd Baron Lyell (1913–1943), Second World War Victoria Cross
 Thomas Daniel Knox, 6th Earl of Ranfurly KCMG (1914–1988), Second World War ADC Lieutenant General Sir Philip Neame VC, POW
 Captain Guy Ruggles-Brise (1914–2000), Second World War commando, POW, stockbroker, land-owner
Richard Kay-Shuttleworth, 2nd Baron Shuttleworth (1937–1940), a fighter pilot killed in the Battle of Britain
Michael Morris, 3rd Baron Killanin (1914–1999)
William Henry Rhodes-Moorhouse (1914–1940), Royal Air Force pilot; killed in the Battle of Britain
Antony Fisher (1915–1988) British businessman and think tank founder
John Brocklebank (1915–1974), aristocrat, first-class cricketer, British Army major
Michael Magill (1915–1940), first-class cricketer
James Palmer-Tomkinson (1915–1952)
Derek Prince (1915–2003), international Bible teacher
Surendra Mohan Kumaramangalam (1916–1973) Indian politician and communist theorist 
Robin Maugham, 2nd Viscount Maugham (1916–1981)
Dennis Poore (1916–1987), racing driver, entrepreneur and financier, Chairman, Manganese Bronze Holdings
Geoffrey Keyes VC (1917–1941), Second World War Victoria Cross
George Mann (1917–2001), cricketer
Nigel Nicolson (1917–2004), author and journalist
Gavin Astor, 2nd Baron Astor of Hever (1918–1984), President, Times newspapers, 1967–1981
Rowland Baring, 3rd Earl of Cromer (1918–1991), Governor, Bank of England, 1961–1966, managing director, Baring Brothers & Co, 1948–1961, 1967–1970
Granville Leveson-Gower, 5th Earl Granville (1918–1996), Lord Lieutenant of the Western Isles 
Sir Roger de Grey (1918–1995), visual artist; President of the Royal Academy (1984–1993)
Michael England (1918–2007), cricketer
Peter Opie (1918–1982), historian of childhood lore
David Ormsby-Gore (1918–1985), politician and British Ambassador to the USA
Tim Westoll (1918–1999), Chairman of Cumberland and Cumbria County Council 1959–1976
Michael Benthall (1919–1974), theatre director
Denis Cannan (1919–2011), dramatist and screenwriter
Peter Carington, 6th Baron Carrington (1919–2018), Secretary of State for Defence, 1970–1974, Secretary of State for Foreign and Commonwealth Affairs, 1979–1982, and Secretary General of NATO, 1984–1988
Sir Ludovic Kennedy (1919–2009), journalist, broadcaster, political activist and author

1920s
Andrew Cavendish, 11th Duke of Devonshire (1920–2004), Minister of State for Commonwealth Relations 1962–1964
Henry Chadwick (1920–2008), Regius Professor of Divinity, University of Oxford, 1959–1969, Regius Professor of Divinity, University of Cambridge, 1969–1979, and Master of Peterhouse, Cambridge, 1987–1993
John Edmondson, 2nd Baron Sandford (1920–2009), politician and clergyman
Michael Farebrother (1920–1987), cricketer and educator
David Jamieson VC (1920–2001), Second World War Victoria Cross
Sir John Jardine Paterson (1920–2000), Calcutta businessman
John Maynard Smith (1920–2004), evolutionary biologist
Peter Benenson (1921–2005), founder of Amnesty International
Fiennes Cornwallis, 3rd Baron Cornwallis (1921–2010)
Humphrey Lyttelton (1921–2008), jazz musician, band leader, composer, and chairman of BBC radio programme I'm Sorry I Haven't a Clue
Michael Bentine (1922–1996), actor and comedian
Hugo Charteris (1922–1970), author and screenwriter
Adrian Liddell Hart (1922–1991), author and adventurer
Patrick Macnee (1922–2015), actor
Edward Boyle, Baron Boyle of Handsworth (1923–1981), Financial Secretary to the Treasury, 1959–1962, and Vice-Chancellor, University of Leeds, 1970–1981
Field Marshal Edwin Bramall, Baron Bramall (1923–2019), Commander-in-Chief, United Kingdom Land Forces, 1976–1978, Vice Chief of the Defence Staff, 1978–1979, and Chief of the General Staff, 1979–1982
James Chichester-Clark, Baron Moyola (1923–2002), Prime Minister of Northern Ireland, 1969–1971
Charles Howard, 12th Earl of Carlisle, (1923–1994)
Michael Jaffé (1923–1997)
George Lascelles, 7th Earl of Harewood (1923–2011), managing director, 1972–1985, and chairman, 1986–1995, English National Opera, and President, British Board of Film Classification, 1985–1997
Nicholas Mosley, 3rd Baron Ravensdale (1923–2017), author
Richard Ollard (1923–2007), author, editor and historian
Sir John Smith (1923–2007), director, Coutts and Co, 1950–1993
Prince Alexander of Yugoslavia (1924–2016)
Edward Thomas Hall (1924–2001), scientist
Robin Howard (1924–1989), philanthropist, dance patron and founder of The Place
Myles Ponsonby (1924–1999), intelligence officer, diplomat, British Ambassador to Mongolia
John Bayley (1925–2015), Warton Professor of English, University of Oxford, 1974–1992
Sir William Gladstone, 7th Baronet (1925–2018), Headmaster of Lancing College, 1961–1969, and Chief Scout of the United Kingdom, 1972–1982
Michael Keeling (1925–2017), cricketer
Julian Mond, 3rd Baron Melchett (1925–1973) English industrialist and Chairman British Steel Corporation 1966–1973
John Spencer-Churchill, 11th Duke of Marlborough (1926–2014)
Robert Goff, Baron Goff of Chieveley (1926–2016), Lord Justice of Appeal, 1982–1986, and Lord of Appeal in Ordinary, 1986–1998
Robert Armstrong, Baron Armstrong of Ilminster (1927–2020), Permanent Under-Secretary of State for the Home Department, 1977–1979, and Cabinet Secretary, 1979–1987
John Coldstream (born 1927), Professor of Aegean Archaeology, King's College London, 1975–1983, and Yates Professor of Classical Art and Archaeology, University College London, 1983–1992
Peter Dickinson (1927–2015), author
West de Wend Fenton (1927-2002), adventurer and eccentric
John Habgood, Baron Habgood (1927–2019), Bishop of Durham, 1973–1983, and Archbishop of York, 1983–1995
Robin Leigh-Pemberton, Baron Kingsdown (1927–2013), Governor, Bank of England, 1983–1993
Sir Reresby Sitwell, 7th Baronet (1927–2009)
Francis Haskell, professor of history of art at Oxford (1928–2000)
Major General Sir John Acland (1928–2006), General Officer Commanding, South West District, 1978–1981
John Barton (1928–2018), Associate Director, Royal Shakespeare Company, 1964–1991
Anthony Blond (1928–2008), publisher
Alan Clark (1928–1999), politician and diarist
Sir Angus Ogilvy (1928–2004), husband of Princess Alexandra
Abdellatief Abouheif (1929–2008), Egyptian swimming champion
Sir Piers Bengough (1929–2005), The Queen's Representative at Ascot, 1982–1997
Sir Adrian Cadbury (1929–2015), managing director, 1969–1974, and chairman, 1975–1989, Cadbury Schweppes
John Julius Cooper, 2nd Viscount Norwich (1929–2018), writer, broadcaster and historian
Charles Gordon-Lennox, 10th Duke of Richmond (1929–2017), Member of the House of Lords, 1989–1999 Lord Lieutenant of West Sussex, 1990–1994
John Lawrence, 2nd Baron Oaksey (1929–2012), horseracing commentator and journalist
Anthony Lloyd, Baron Lloyd of Berwick (born 1929), Lord Justice of Appeal, 1984–1993, and Lord of Appeal in Ordinary, 1993–1999
Sebastian Snow (1929–2001), explorer and writer
Christopher Davidge (1929–2014), Olympic rower and High Sheriff of Northamptonshire
Jeremy Thorpe (1929–2014), Leader of the Liberal Party, 1967–1976
Philip Ziegler (1929–2023), author and historian

1930s
Sir Antony Acland (1930-2021), ambassador to Luxembourg, 1975–1977, Spain, 1977–1979, and the United States, 1986–1991, Permanent Under-Secretary of State for Foreign and Commonwealth Affairs, 1982–1986, and Provost of Eton, 1991–2000
Antony Armstrong-Jones, 1st Earl of Snowdon (1930–2017), photographer
Malcolm Erskine, 17th Earl of Buchan (1930-2022)
Charles A. Burney (born 1930), archaeologist
Sir Thomas Hare, 5th Baronet (1930–1993), cricketer
Julian Haviland (born 1930), the Political Editor of ITN, 1975–1981, and The Times newspaper, 1981–1986
Douglas Hurd, Baron Hurd of Westwell (born 1930), Secretary of State for Northern Ireland, 1984–1985, Home Secretary, 1985–1989, and Secretary of State for Foreign and Commonwealth Affairs, 1989–1995
Sir (Henry) Saxon Tate, 5th Baronet (1931–2012), Tate & Lyle MD and businessman 
Jeremy Sandford (1930–2003), screenwriter 
Julian Slade (1930–2006), author and composer
Neal Ascherson (born 1932), journalist and author
Colin Clark (1932–2002), filmmaker
Tam Dalyell (1932–2017), politician
Sir Howard Hodgkin (1932–2017), painter
Rory McEwen (1932–1982), painter
Teddy Millington-Drake (1932–1994), artist
Tim Renton (1932-2020), Baron Renton of Mount Harry, Conservative politician
Sir Jocelyn Stevens (1932–2014), managing director, Evening Standard, 1969–1972, Daily Express, 1972–1974, Beaverbrook Newspapers, 1974–1977, and Express Newspapers, 1977–1981
Alexander Thynn, 7th Marquess of Bath (1932–2020), owner of Longleat
Richard Abel Smith (1933–2004), British Army officer
Jeremy Brett (1933–1995), actor
Sir James Goldsmith (1933–1997), entrepreneur and politician
William Goodhart, Baron Goodhart (1933–2017), Liberal Democrat politician and lawyer
Sir John Gurdon (born 1933), Fullerian Professor of Physiology and Comparative Anatomy, Royal Institution, 1985–1991, John Humphrey Plummer Professor of Cell Biology, University of Cambridge, 1991–2001, and Master of Magdalene College, Cambridge, 1995–2002, Nobel Prize for Physiology or Medicine winner 2012
Daniel Massey (1933–1998), actor
Hugo Anthony Meynell (1936-2021), author, son of Captain Godfrey Meynell
John Michell (1933–2009), writer on esoterica and sacred geometry
William Weir, 3rd Viscount Weir (born 1933), merchant banker and chairman of the Weir Group
Richard Bingham, 7th Earl of Lucan (born 1934)
John Farmer (born 1934), cricketer
Reshad Feild (Richard Timothy Feild) (1934–2016)
Professor Robin Milner FRS (1934–2010), informatician and computer scientist.
John Standing (born 1934), actor
Ben Whitaker (1934–2014), author
Robin Dixon, 3rd Baron Glentoran (born 1935), politician; Olympic Games gold medal winner.
Prince Edward, Duke of Kent (born 1935)
Bamber Gascoigne (1935-2022), author and broadcaster
Michael Holroyd (born 1935), author and biographer
Peter Palumbo, Baron Palumbo (born 1935), Chairman, Arts Council of Great Britain, 1989–1994
Andrew Rowe (1935–2008) schoolmaster, civil servant, and member of parliament
Andrew Sinclair (1935–2019), author and historian
Alan Montagu-Stuart-Wortley-Mackenzie, 4th Earl of Wharncliffe (1935–1987)
Admiral of the Fleet Sir Benjamin Bathurst (born 1936), Chief of Fleet Support, 1986–1989, Commander-in-Chief Fleet, 1989–1991, Vice Chief of the Defence Staff, 1991–1993, and First Sea Lord, 1993–1995
Duff Hart-Davis (born 1936), author and journalist
Peter Hill-Wood (1936–2018), Chairman, Arsenal F.C., 1982–2013
Hugh Hudson (born 1936), film director
Jacob Rothschild, 4th Baron Rothschild (born 1936), investment banker
David Lytton-Cobbold, 2nd Baron Cobbold (born 1937)
Charles Douglas-Home (1937–1985), Editor, The Times, 1982–1985
Sir Arthur Gooch, 14th Baronet (born 1937), soldier
Derry Moore (born 1937), photographer
Conrad Russell, 5th Earl Russell (born 1937), Astor Professor of British History, University College London, 1984–1990, and Professor of British History, King's College London, 1990–2002
Arthur Gore, 9th Earl of Arran (born 1938), politician
David Benedictus (born 1938), writer and director
Henry Keswick (businessman) (born 1938) businessman, industrialist
Angus Douglas-Hamilton, 15th Duke of Hamilton (1938–2010) premier peer of Scotland
Christopher Gibbs (1938–2018), art dealer
Jonathan Riley-Smith (1938–2016), Professor of History, Royal Holloway College, London, 1978–1994, and Dixie Professor of Ecclesiastical History, University of Cambridge, 1994–2011
Henry Blofeld (born 1939), cricket commentator and journalist
Jonathan Cecil (1939–2011), actor
Archibald Montgomerie, 18th Earl of Eglinton (1939–2018)
Grey Gowrie (born 1939), politician and arts administrator
Colin Thubron (born 1939), travel writer and novelist
Simon Cairns, 6th Earl Cairns (born 1939), businessman

1940s
Perry Anderson (born 1940), Marxist intellectual and editor of New Left Review
John Baskervyle-Glegg (1940–2004), British Army general and first-class cricketer
Sir Dominic Cadbury (born 1940), chief executive, 1984–1993, and chairman, 1993–2000, Cadbury Schweppes, and chairman, Wellcome Trust, 2000–
Chips Keswick (born 1940) industrialist
Christopher Cazenove (1940–2010), actor
Adrian Hollis (1940–2013), classical scholar and chess grandmaster
H. Jones (1940–82), Falklands War Victoria Cross
Sir William Mahon, 7th Baronet (born 1940), soldier
Tristram Powell (born 1940), television director
Prince William of Gloucester (1941–1972)
Jeremy Clyde (born 1941), actor
Hugh Cavendish, Baron Cavendish of Furness (born 1941)
Robert Fellowes, Baron Fellowes (born 1941), Private Secretary to The Queen, 1990–1999
Heathcote Williams (born 1941), poet, actor and playwright
Sir George Young, 6th Baronet (born 1941), Secretary of State for Transport, 1995–1997
Prince Michael of Kent (born 1942)
Jonathan Aitken (born 1942), Chief Secretary to the Treasury, 1994–1995, and writer
Sir Nicholas Bonsor (born 1942), politician
Simon Keswick (born 1942), industrialist
Robert Christie (1942–2012), cricketer
Sir Andrew Collins (born 1942), High Court judge
Piers Courage (1942–1970), racing driver
James Douglas-Hamilton, Baron Selkirk of Douglas (born 1942), politician and author
Charles McCreery (born 1942), psychologist and author
Richard Francis Needham, 6th Earl of Kilmorey (born 1942), politician and businessman
William Nimmo Smith, Lord Nimmo Smith (born 1942), judge
Derek Parfit (1942–2017), philosopher
Malcolm Pearson, Baron Pearson of Rannoch (born 1942), Former Leader of UKIP
Sir Adam Ridley (born 1942), civil servant and banker
Hugo Williams (born 1942), writer, critic and poet
Adam Hart-Davis (born 1943), writer and broadcaster
Ian Ogilvy (born 1943), actor
Prince Richard, Duke of Gloucester (born 1944)
Jeremy Child (born 1944), actor
Magnus Linklater CBE journalist, writer, & former newspaper editor
Richard Cory-Wright (born 1944) 4th Baronet Cory-Wright
Sir Ranulph Fiennes (born 1944), explorer
Mark Fisher (born 1944), MP
Peter Morrison (1944–95) Parliamentary Private Secretary (PPS) to former British Prime Minister Margaret Thatcher and MP for Chester from 1974 to 1992
Danus Skene (1944-2016), Scottish Labour, then Liberal Democrat, and finally SNP politician
Birendra of Nepal (1945–2001), King of Nepal 1972–2001
David Calvert-Smith born 1945, English judge
Robert Carnwath, Lord Carnwath of Notting Hill (born 1945), Justice of the Supreme Court of the United Kingdom, 2012–
Rupert Daniels (born 1945), cricketer
Charles Wellesley, 9th Duke of Wellington (born 1945), Conservative MEP and Chairman of the Council of King's College London
Douglas Hogg, 3rd Viscount Hailsham (born 1945), Minister of Agriculture, Fisheries and Food, 1995–1997
Francis Pryor (born 1945) archeologist, author and broadcaster
David Jessel (born 1945), television journalist and broadcaster
Shaun Agar, 6th Earl of Normanton (1945–2019), landowner and powerboat racer
Sir Francis Richards (born 1945), Director, Government Communications Headquarters, 1998–2003, and Governor of Gibraltar, 2003–
Evelyn Baring, 4th Earl of Cromer (born 1946), banker 
Robert Gascoyne-Cecil, 7th Marquess of Salisbury (born 1946), Lord Privy Seal and Leader of the House of Lords, 1994–1997
Sir Michael Burton (born 1946), High Court Judge
Robin Lane Fox (born 1946), Reader in Ancient History, University of Oxford, 1990–
William Shawcross (born 1946), Chairman of the Charity Commission for England and Wales; writer and broadcaster
William Waldegrave, Baron Waldegrave of North Hill (born 1946), Secretary of State for Health, 1990–1992, Minister of Agriculture, Fisheries and Food, 1994–95, and Chief Secretary to the Treasury, 1995–1997, Provost of Eton
Christopher Charles Lyttelton, 12th Viscount Cobham (born 1947), nobleman and financial consultant to Smith and Williamson
Sir Robert Fulton (born 1948), Governor of Gibraltar and Commandant General Royal Marines
Hector McDonnell (born 1947), artist and author 
Richard Alston (born 1948), Artistic Director, Ballet Rambert, 1986–1992, and choreographer
Charles Pepys, 8th Earl of Cottenham, cricketer and equestrian 
Merlin Hay, 24th Earl of Erroll (born 1948), Member of the House of Lords, Chief of the Scottish Clan Hay and Lord High Constable of Scotland
Jonathan Sumption, Lord Sumption (born 1948), Supreme Court judge and Historian.
Peter Robert Henry Mond, 4th Baron Melchett (1948–2018), Former Lord in Waiting, Parliamentary Under-Secretary of State and Minister of State.
Simon Hornblower (born 1949), Professor of Classics and Ancient History, University College London, 1997–
Richard Jenkyns (born 1949), Professor of the Classical Tradition at Oxford University
Barry Johnston (born 1949), writer and producer
Hugh Matheson (rower) (born 1949), British rower and Olympic silver medallist, journalist and author
William Legge, 10th Earl of Dartmouth (born 1949), UK Independence Party MEP
David Rendel (1949–2016), Member of Parliament
John Pawson (Born 1949), architect

1950s
Edward Bennett (born 1950), television director
Andrew Douglas-Home (born 1950), Scottish first-class cricketer
Jonathon Porritt (born 1950), Director, Friends of the Earth, 1984–1990, and Forum for the Future, 1996–, writer and broadcaster
Michael Hicks Beach, 3rd Earl St Aldwyn (born 1950), business man 
David Tredinnick born 1950, Conservative MP, member of the Health Select Committee and Science and Technology Select Committee, and alternative medicine advocate
John Wodehouse (born 1951), 5th Earl of Kimberley
Mark Douglas-Home (born 1951), Editor, The Herald, 2000–
David Maxwell (born 1951), British rower and Olympic silver medallist
Nick Ormerod (born 1951), stage designer
S. P. Somtow (born 1952), musical composer and author
James Arbuthnot (born 1952), politician
William Waldorf Astor, Viscount Astor (born 1951), businessman, politician
Reggie Oliver (born 1952) author
David Gilmour, Baron Gilmour of Craigmillar (born 1952), Scottish historian and author
Robin Drysdale (born 1952), tennis player, 1977 Australian Open quarter-finalist
David Sheepshanks (born 1952) joint-acting Chairman of the Football Association
Martin Taylor (born 1952), chief executive, Courtaulds Textiles, 1990–1993, and Barclays Bank, 1994–1998, and chairman, W. H. Smith Group, 1999–2003
Matthew Carr (1953–2011), artist
Geoffrey Clifton-Brown (born 1953), MP for the Cotswolds
Robert Harvey (born 1953), author and journalist
Oliver James (born 1953), psychologist
Simon Mann (born 1953), soldier and mercenary
Zera Yacob Amha Selassie (born 1953) Crown Prince of Ethiopia
John Sinclair, 3rd Viscount Thurso (born 1953) Liberal Democrat politician
Patrick Stopford, 9th Earl of Courtown (born 1954), politician
Richard Scott, 10th Duke of Buccleuch (born 1954), aristocrat and landowner
Peter Ramsauer (born 1954) German Cabinet Minister - Federal Minister of Transport, Building and Urban Development 2009 -
John Barclay (born 1954), cricketer and cricket manager
Jamie Borwick, Lord Borwick (born 1955), former chairman, Manganese Bronze Holdings
Michael Chance (born 1955), counter-tenor
Charles Gordon-Lennox, Earl of March and Kinrara (born 1955), president, British Automobile Racing Club, founder, Goodwood Festival of Speed
Francis Grier (born 1955), organist, choir conductor and composer
Nicky Gumbel (born 1955), priest and religious leader
Charles Shaughnessy (born 1955), Actor, 5th Baron Shaughnessy (2007– )
Robert Currey (born 1955), astrologer
Bill Turnbull (1956-2022), journalist and television presenter
Dominic Lawson (born 1956), Editor, The Spectator, 1990–1995, and The Sunday Telegraph, 1995–
Oliver Letwin (born 1956), Shadow Home Secretary, 2001–2003, Shadow Chancellor of the Exchequer, 2003–2005, and Shadow Secretary of State for Environment, Food and Rural Affairs, 2005–
Charles Moore (born 1956), Editor, The Spectator, 1984–1990, The Sunday Telegraph, 1990–1995, and The Daily Telegraph, 1995–2003
David Goodhart, journalist, commentator, author, director of the think tank Demos 
Justin Welby (born 1956), Bishop of Durham, 2011–2012; 105th Archbishop of Canterbury, 2013 - 
George Herbert, 8th Earl of Carnarvon (born November 1956) aristocrat and landowner
Geoffrey Adams (born 1957), diplomat
Nicholas Coleridge (born 1957), Editor, Harpers and Queen, 1986–1989, and President, Condé Nast Publications, 1992–
Sir Thomas Hughes-Hallett (born 1954),British barrister, investment banker and philanthropy executive
Pico Iyer (born 1957), author
Adam Nicolson (born 1957), author
Andrew Robinson (born 1957), Literary Editor, Times Higher Education Supplement, and writer
Robin Birley (born 1958), businessman
Richard Graham (politician) (born 1958)
Matt Ridley, 5th Viscount Ridley (born 1958), zoologist
Hugo Guinness (born 1959), artist and writer
Hugh Laurie (born 1959), actor and comedian
Nicholas Macpherson (born 1959), Permanent Secretary to the Treasury
John Rawlinson (born 1959), cricketer and artist
Rupert Soames (born 1959), industrialist, CEO Aggreko
Hugo Swire (born 1959), Minister of State, Northern Ireland
Stephen Wolfram (born 1959), physicist and computer scientist
Sir Aubrey Thomas Brocklebank (born 1952), entrepreneur
James Sassoon, Baron Sassoon (born 1955), businessman and politician
David Profumo (born 1955), author

1960s
Robert Hanson (born 1960), financier
Charlie Brooks (racehorse trainer) (born 1963), racehorse trainer
Johnnie Boden (born 1961), internet entrepreneur, founder of Boden catalogue
Jesse Norman, Conservative politician
Roland Watson, journalist
Edmund Pery, 7th Earl of Limerick (born 1963)
Geordie Greig (born 1960), editor, The Mail on Sunday
Julian Nott (born 1960), film composer
Alex Renton (born 1961), journalist and author
Alex Wilmot-Sitwell (born 1961), co-chairman & CEO, UBS Investment Bank
Nick Hurd (born 1962), politician
Nigel Oakes (born 1962), businessman
Alexander Cameron (born 1963), barrister
Rupert Goodman DL (born 1963), publisher
Sir Timothy Gowers (born 1963), Rouse Ball Professor of Mathematics, University of Cambridge, 1995–
Patrick Hennessy, Deputy Director of Communications for the Labour Party
Jay Jopling (born 1963), art dealer
José Manuel Entrecanales (born 1963), chairman of Acciona
James Palumbo (born 1963), club owner, founder of the Ministry of Sound
Harry Rawlinson (1963–2011), cricketer
Marcus Armytage (born 1964), National Hunt jockey, Grand National winner, Daily Telegraph racing correspondent
Simon Bowthorpe (born 1964), chief executive, Media Force One
Sir Edward Dashwood (born 1964), West Wycombe Park
Boris Johnson (born 1964), Prime Minister of the United Kingdom 2019–2022, and former Mayor of London
Richard Farnes (born 1964), music director, Opera North
Darius Guppy (born 1964), criminal
Charles Spencer, 9th Earl Spencer (born 1964), formerly Charles, Viscount Althorp
Cornelius Lysaght (born 1965), horseracing broadcaster
Paul Watkins (born 1964), novelist
Abhisit "Mark" Vejjajiva (born 1964), 27th Prime Minister of Thailand
Nicholas Wheeler (born 1965), Entrepreneur, founder of Charles Tyrwhitt
Hugh Fearnley-Whittingstall (born 1965), chef, writer and television presenter
James Wood (born 1965), literary critic
Giles Andreae (born 1966), author
Sebastian James (born 1966), chief executive, Boots UK
Bill Wiggin (born 1966), Member of Parliament
David Cameron (born 1966), Prime Minister of the United Kingdom 2010–2016
Edward Llewellyn (Conservative advisor) (born 1966), Conservative Central Office
Anthony Loyd (born 1966), journalist and author
Nicholas Rowe (born 1966), actor
Ed Shearmur (born 1966), film composer
Stephen Layton (born 1966), conductor
David Runciman (born 1967), Professor of Politics, Cambridge University
George Bingham, 8th Earl of Lucan (born 1967), peer
Thomas Cholmondeley (1968–2016), Anglo-Kenyan farmer
Brent Hoberman (born 1968), chief executive, Lastminute.com, 1998–
Atticus Ross (born 1968), composer, Academy Award winner
Clifton Wrottesley, 14th Baronet, 6th Baron Wrottesley (born 1968), Irish Olympian and Cresta Run rider
William Fox-Pitt (born 1969), three-day eventing rider
James Landale (born 1969), journalist
James Owen (born 1969), author and journalist
Jacob Rees-Mogg (born 1969), Member of Parliament
Boris Starling (born 1969), novelist
Dominic West (born 1969), actor
William Sitwell (born 1969) journalist, food critic

1970s
Lord Bridges of Headley (born 1970), politician
Will Keen (born 1970), actor
Sir Matthew Pinsent (born 1970), oarsman
Henry Dimbleby (born 1970) food writer and businessman
Sebastian Doggart (born 1970), film director and journalist
Conrad Wolfram (born 1970), technologist
Chris Rokos (born 1970), hedge fund manager
William Fiennes (born 1970), author
David Watson (born 1970), record producer
 King Dipendra of Nepal (1971–2001), briefly King of Nepal, 2001
Christopher de Bellaigue, writer, born 1973
Charles Cumming (born 1971), novelist
Jo Johnson (born 1971), Conservative MP for Orpington & Number 10 Policy Chief
Damian Lewis (born 1971), actor
Nathaniel Philip Rothschild (born 1971), financier 
Jeremy Sheldon (born 1971), author
Guy Walters (born 1971), novelist and journalist
Hugh Crossley, 4th Baron Somerleyton (born 1971, restaurateur and hotel owner
Oliver Dimsdale (born 1972), actor
Ewan Birney (born 1972), Scientist
Peter Morgan (born 1972), cricketer
Oliver Milburn (born 1973), actor
Rory Stewart (born 1973), explorer, writer and Member of Parliament
Tom Parker Bowles (born 1974), food writer (book, newspaper, magazine) and food programme television presenter, son of Camilla, Queen Consort
Will Adamsdale (born 1974), actor
James Archer (stock trader) (born 1974)
Bear Grylls (born 1974), mountaineer, motivational speaker, and writer
Alexander Windsor, Earl of Ulster (born 1974) Son of Prince Richard, Duke of Gloucester 
Dominic Cazenove (born 1975), actor
Ed Coode (born 1975), oarsman
Edward Gardner (conductor) (born 1975), music director, English National Opera
Zac Goldsmith (born 1975), politician 
Kwasi Kwarteng (born 1975), Conservative MP and historian
Alexander Nix (born 1975), former CEO of Cambridge Analytica 
Julian Ovenden (born 1975), actor and singer
Ben Elliot (born 1975), English businessman, nephew of Camilla, Queen Consort
Tobias Beer (born 1976), actor
Majid Jafar (born 1976), businessman
Alexander Fiske-Harrison (born 1976), actor and writer
Khalid bin Bandar Al Saud (born 1977), Saudi Ambassador to the United Kingdom
Jordan Frieda (born 1977), actor
Justin Gayner (born 1977), businessman
Andrew Lindsay (born 1977), oarsman
Prince Nirajan of Nepal (1977–2001)
Rupert Harrison (born 1978), Economic Advisor to the Treasury
Richard Mason (born 1978), novelist
Douglas Murray (born 1979), author
James Bruce (born 1979), cricketer
Marius Stravinsky (born 1979), conductor
Nicholas Ashley-Cooper, 12th Earl of Shaftesbury (born 1979), British peer and philanthropist
Alexander Gilkes (born 1979), co-founder of online auction house Paddle8
William Sackville, Lord Buckhurst (born 1979), banker

1980s
Nick Eziefula (born 1980), singer-songwriter
Iain Hollingshead (born 1980), writer
Alex Payne (born 1980), television presenter
Alex Loudon (born 1980), England and Warwickshire cricketer
Simon Woods (born 1980), actor
Ben Goldsmith (born 1981), businessman and environmentalist
Harry Hadden-Paton (born 1981), actor
Nyasha Hatendi (born 1981), actor and producer
Tom Hiddleston (born 1981), actor
Sam Hoare (born 1981), actor
Frank Turner (born 1981), singer-songwriter
Charles Innes-Ker, 11th Duke of Roxburghe (born 1981)
Sebastian Armesto (born 1982), actor
The Prince of Wales (born 1982)
Humphrey Ker (born 1982), comedian, writer and actor
Eddie Redmayne (born 1982), actor
Ivo Stourton, (born 1982), author and solicitor
Rakhil Fernando, (born 1982), businessman
Nicholas Collon, (born 1983), conductor
Adetomiwa Edun, (born 1983), actor
Harry Lloyd (born 1983), actor
James Sherlock (born 1983), pianist
Prince Harry, Duke of Sussex (born 1984)
Bim Afolami (born 1986), Conservative Politician and MP
Alex Ball (born 1986), cricketer
Tom Lyon (real name Richard Jones) (born 1986), escapologist and magician
Drummond Money-Coutts (born 1986), conjuror
Oliver Proudlock (born 1986), fashion designer & model
Charlie Siem (born 1986), contemporary violinist and model
Tom Palmer (born 1987), comedian and actor
Tom Stourton (born 1987), comedian and actor
James Macadam (born 1988), cricketer
Spencer Matthews (born 1988), reality television personality 
Edward Windsor, Lord Downpatrick (born 1988), fashion designer
Max Pirkis (born 1989), actor
Ben Lamb (born 1989), actor
Alex Hua Tian (born 1989), Olympic equestrian

1990s
Lawrence Clarke (born 1990), 110m hurdler
Ivo Graham (born 1990), comedian
Alex Stobbs (born 1990), British musician
Constantine Louloudis (born 1991), British rower and Olympic gold medallist
Will Vanderspar (born 1991), English cricketer
Kanes Sucharitakul (born 1992), Thai alpine skier
Joe Armon-Jones (born 1993), British jazz musician 
Parit Wacharasindhu (born 1993), Thai politician and businessman 
Parker Liautaud (born 1994), polar adventurer and environmental campaigner
Jonah Hauer-King (born 1995), actor, World on Fire
Samuel Chatto (born 1996) Grandson of Princess Margaret 
Jack Rogers (born 1998), English cricketer
Tade Ojora (born 1999), 110m hurdler
Charles Armstrong-Jones, Viscount Linley (born 1999) Grandson of Princess Margaret 
Arthur Chatto (born 1999) Grandson of Princess Margaret

See also
List of Old Etonians born before the 18th century
List of Old Etonians born in the 18th century
List of Old Etonians born in the 19th century
List of King's Scholars

References

 
Lists of people associated with Eton College
Lists of 20th-century people
20th century in England